The Best of Mark Schultz is a compilation album featuring Mark Schultz's greatest hits.

Background
Schultz will promote the album during his Renaissance Tour with Jason Gray and David Klinkenberg. The tour will also promote his forthcoming instrumental album Renaissance. For now, the album will only be released during the tour and will have a later release date.

Track listing

Charts

References

2011 compilation albums
Mark Schultz (musician) albums